Chuvarez (Sıbaryaź) is a rural locality (a village) in Cherkassky Selsoviet, Ufimsky District, Bashkortostan, Russia. The population was 216 as of 2010. There are 3 streets.

Geography 
Chuvarez is located 34 km northeast of Ufa (the district's administrative centre) by road. Kundryak is the nearest rural locality.

References 

Rural localities in Ufimsky District